The Gibraltar in Westminster Movement, formerly known as the Integration With Britain Movement was formed in 1963 (IWBM) as a political pressure group in Gibraltar it was recently re-formed from the now defunct Integration With Britain Party (IWBP). The IWBM is currently led by Joe Caruana (not to be confused with Joe Bossano or Peter Caruana)

The movement's core belief is that the best future for Gibraltar is to become further integrated with the United Kingdom, attaining a state of devolved integration similar to that pertaining in Scotland and Wales. Although the IWBM has not fought any elections, they did receive support from the now defunct Independent Liberal Forum (ILF, later known as the Reform Party) as well as from the also now defunct Gibraltar Labour Party. The Party has enjoyed basic levels of support from members of the Public living in Gibraltar, although neither the British nor the Gibraltar governments have made any comments on the movement.

External links
 Official site
 ILF links with IWBM
 Letters in Panorama discussing issue of integration 
 IWBM Press Release
 IWBM Press Release
 Article by Joe Caruana on tripartite agreements

Political organisations based in Gibraltar